Jellyfish Entertainment, is a South Korean entertainment company established by composer and producer Hwang Se-jun in Seoul, South Korea.

Jellyfish Entertainment is the home of artists including Jang Hye-jin, VIXX, Verivery and formerly gugudan, Park Yoon-ha. The agency is also the home of actors including Kim Sun-young, Kim Se-jeong, Lim Seul-ong and Kim Min-kyu.

History

2007–2011: Founding and beginning
Jellyfish Entertainment was founded on August 17, 2007 in Seoul by composer and producer Hwang Se-jun. The first artist to sign under the company was the established ballad singer Sung Si-kyung, who released the single "Parting Once Again". One year later, the company signed Lisa and Park Hak-ki.

In November 2008, singer Park Hyo-shin signed to the agency and was featured on the album Hwang Project Vol.1 Welcome To The Fantastic World. The following year, Super Star K contestant Seo In-guk and Altair (Lee Ji-hoon) later joined Jellyfish Entertainment.

In December 2010, Jellyfish Entertainment artists collaborated for the Jelly Christmas holiday album project with the lead single "Christmas Time". In December 2011 Sung Si-kyung, Brian Joo, Seo In-guk, Park Hak-ki, Park Jang-hyun and Hwang Project collaborated again for Jelly Christmas with the single "Christmas for All".

2012-2015: VIXX and company acquisition
In April 2012, Jellyfish Entertainment revealed lineup trainees of their upcoming boy group and formed the boy group on MyDOL, a competition survival show that aired on Mnet. The winners debuted as a member of VIXX on May 24, 2012. In June, Lee Seok-hoon of SG Wannabe released the digital single "The Beginning of Love" (Y.Bird from Jellyfish Island with Lee Seok Hoon) as part of Hwang Se-jun's Y.Bird from Jellyfish Island project. On September 12, Jellyfish Entertainment held their first live concert Jellyfish Live at Tokyo's Zepp Diver City in Japan, and in December, both Park Hyo-shin and Sung Si-kyung held concert performances in Seoul. Jellyfish Entertainment's artists collaborated again for the Jelly Christmas 2012 Heart Project with the single “Because It's Christmas” with the proceeds from the project donated to The Salvation Army Korea.

In February 2013, the Y.Bird from Jellyfish Island project released the digital singles "I Can't Live Because of You" by Seo In-guk featuring Verbal Jint (Y.BIRD from Jellyfish Island With Seo In Guk) in February and "Girl’s Why?" by VIXX and indie duo OKDAL (Y.BIRD from Jellyfish with VIXX & OKDAL) in October. In December, 19% of Jellyfish's shares were acquired by their distributor, CJ E&M and joined the CJ E&M label system as an independent label.

In July 2015, K-pop Star 4 TOP 6 contestant Park Yoon-ha signed under the agency.  following month, VIXX LR was formed as the sub-unit of VIXX, composed of rapper Ravi and vocalist Leo. The Jelly Christmas 2015 single was released on December 15 with the song "Love In The Air".

2016–2018: Produce, Gugudan, and expansion into acting
In the first half of 2016, Jellyfish trainees Kim Na-young, Kang Mi-na and Kim Se-jeong represented Jellyfish Entertainment in the television survival show Produce 101. Kang Mi-na and Kim Se-jeong winning the survival show debuted as part of the lineup of the year-long project girl group I.O.I, while still under Jellyfish Entertainment. It was confirmed that following their promotions as part of I.O.I, the trainees would officially debut as members of the agency's first girl group. On June 3, Jellyfish Entertainment launch their new music channel Jelly Box. Jelly Box is similar to Jellyfish Entertainment's previous project Y.Bird from Jellyfish Island and it will showcase Jellyfish Entertainment artists and producers and include collaborations with artists outside of the label. On June 28, Jellyfish debuted the nine-member girl group Gugudan. In August, Park Hyo-shin departed from the agency after eight years working together. In October, Jellyfish Entertainment announced that former Dal Shabet member Jiyul, signed a contract with the agency in order to pursue her career as an actress. In November, former Jewelry member Kim Ye-won, joined Jellyfish Entertainment as an actress. On December 13, Jellyfish Entertainment released their Jelly Christmas 2016 single album with the song, "Falling", as part of their digital music channel project Jelly Box. The Jellyfish artists participating were Seo In-guk, VIXX, Gugudan, Park Yoon-ha, Park Jung-ah, Kim Gyu-sun, Kim Ye-won and Jiyul.

In April 2017, agency trainee Yun Hee-seok represented Jellyfish Entertainment in the second season of the television survival show Produce 101. On April 10, actress Cho Hye-jung joined Jellyfish Entertainment. In June, actress Jung So-min joined Jellyfish Entertainment. In August, Jellyfish's 32% shares was acquired by CJ E&M, which previously acquired 19% of Jellyfish's shares in 2013 and effectively becoming Jellyfish Entertainment largest shareholder after having 51%. The following month, Gugudan 5959 was formed as the sub-unit of Gugudan, composed of Hyeyeon and Mina. On August 16, indie soloist Jang Hye-jin joined Jellyfish Entertainment.

2019–present: Verivery debut and Gugudan disbandment
On January 9, 2019, Jellyfish debuted their second boy group Verivery. On May 3, agency trainee Kim Min-kyu and Choi Jun-seong represented Jellyfish Entertainment in the fourth season of the television survival show Produce X 101.

On February 4, 2020, it was announced that Lim Seul-ong signed under the label. On March 6, it was revealed that as of June 6, 2019, CJ E&M had sold 40,396 shares of Jellyfish Entertainment for 1.9 billion won. The stake was acquired by Hwang Se-jun, the CEO of the company, increasing his stake from 51% to 73.53%. From May to July, Gugudan member Sally participated in the Chinese television survival show Produce Camp 2020. She placed sixth and made into the final group, BonBon Girls 303. On December 30, Jellyfish Entertainment announced that Gugudan would end all group activities and officially disband on December 31, 2020.

On March 31, 2021, Mimi, Soyee, and Nayoung announced that they would depart from Jellyfish after their contracts have ended.  On April 7, Haebin and Hyeyeon announced their departures from Jellyfish.  On April 30, Hana announced her departure from Jellyfish. On May 11, Jellyfish announced that Sejeong renewed her exclusive contract with the agency. On August 6, Jellyfish Entertainment trainees Kim Da-yeon and Sakamoto Shihona competing in the television survival show Girls Planet 999. On October 22, Dayeon successfully placed 4th in the final lineup of the show's debut group, Kep1er.

Artists

Recording artists

Soloists
 Jang Hye-jin
 Lim Seul-ong
 Kim Se-jeong
 Son Chamchi
 Leo
 Ken

Groups
 VIXX
 Verivery
Sub-units
 VIXX LR
Notable trainees
 Kim Da-yeon (Kep1er)

Studio artists
 Hwang Se-jun (YellowBIRD/Y.BIRD) (executive)
 MELODESIGN
Source:

Actors

 Park Ki-woong
 Park Jung-ah
 Kim Young-ju
 Lim Seul-ong
 Nam Bo-ra
 Kim Min-kyu
 Kim Se-jeong
 Kang Mi-na
 Park Si-young
 Tak-ion
 Ryu Won-woo

Source:

Former artists
Kim Hyeong-jung (2008-2009)
Altair (Lee Ji-hoon) (2009)
Kyun Woo (2010)
Lisa (2008–2010)
Park Hak-ki (2008–2011)
Park Jang-hyun (2011)
Brian Joo (2010–2012)
Lee Seok-hoon (2012–2013)
Park Hyo-shin (2008–2016)
Seo In-guk (2009–2017)
Sung Si-kyung (2007–2018)
Jung So-min (2017–2019)
Kim Ye-won (2016–2022)

VIXX
Ravi (2012–2019)
Hongbin (2012–2020)
N (2012–2020)
Hyuk (2012–2022)
Gong Hyun-joo (2016–2020)
Gugudan (2016–2020)
Mimi (2016–2021)
Hana (2016–2021)
Haebin (2016–2021)
Soyee (2016–2021)
Sally (2016–2023)
Gugudan 5959 (2017–2018)
Hyeyeon (2016–2021)
Gugudan SeMiNa (2018)
Nayoung (2016–2021)
Park Yoon-ha

Discography

Project albums

Jelly Christmas
 Jelly Christmas (2010)
 Jelly Christmas 2011
 Jelly Christmas 2012 Heart Project
 겨울 고백 (Jelly Christmas 2013)
 Jelly Christmas 2015 – 4랑
 Jelly Christmas 2016

Y.Bird from Jellyfish Island
Y.Bird from Jellyfish Island with Lee Seok Hoon (2012)
Y.BIRD from Jellyfish Island With Seo In Guk (2013)
Y.BIRD from Jellyfish Island With VIXX & OKDAL (2013)
Y.BIRD from Jellyfish with LYn X Leo (2014)

Projects
Jelly Box -  music channel

Soundtracks
The Legend of the Blue Sea: Original Soundtrack (2017)
Touch Your Heart: Original Soundtrack (2019)

Concerts
 Jellyfish Live (Japan, 2012)
 Y.Bird from Jellyfish Island Showcase (2013)

Filmography
 2012: MyDOL - Reality show that documented the formation and debut process of Jellyfish Entertainment's first boy band, VIXX.

Partnership
Distributing labels
  Kakao Entertainment (2020–present)
  CJ Victor Entertainment (VIXX) (2012–present)
  Nippon Crown (Seo In-guk) (2013–2017)
  QQ (VIXX) (2015–present)
  Avex Taiwan (VIXX, Gugudan) (2015–present)

Notes

References

External links
 Official website 

 
South Korean record labels
Labels distributed by CJ E&M Music and Live
Labels distributed by Kakao M
Talent agencies of South Korea
K-pop record labels
South Korean companies established in 2007
Record labels established in 2007
Companies based in Seoul
Gangnam District